is a Japanese football player. He plays for Machida Zelvia.

Career
Takuya Yasui joined J1 League club Vissel Kobe in 2017.

Club statistics
Updated to 23 October 2022.

Honours
Vissel Kobe
Emperor's Cup: 2019
Japanese Super Cup: 2020

References

External links

Profile at Vissel Kobe
Profile at J. League

1998 births
Living people
Association football people from Hyōgo Prefecture
Japanese footballers
J1 League players
Vissel Kobe players
J2 League players
FC Machida Zelvia players
Association football midfielders